The 1976 Missouri gubernatorial election was held on November 2, 1976 and resulted in a narrow victory for the Democratic nominee, Joseph P. Teasdale, over the Republican candidate, incumbent Governor Kit Bond, and two other candidates. Teasdale defeated William J. Cason and George D. Weber for the Democratic nomination.

Results

References

Gubernatorial
1976
1976 in Missouri
Missouri
November 1976 events in the United States